Pierre Cogen (born 2 October 1931) is a French organist, composer and teacher.

Biography 
Born in Paris, Cogen studied at the Schola Cantorum. His compositions are primarily for the organ, and he has recorded music by Langlais, Tournemire and others.

Notes

1931 births
Musicians from Paris
Living people
French musicians
20th-century French composers
French male composers
French classical organists
French male organists
Schola Cantorum de Paris alumni
21st-century organists
20th-century French male musicians
21st-century French male musicians
Male classical organists